2-hydroxy-3-keto-5-methylthiopentenyl-1-phosphate phosphatase (EC 3.1.3.87, HK-MTPenyl-1-P phosphatase, MtnX, YkrX) is an enzyme with systematic name 2-hydroxy-5-(methylthio)-3-oxopent-1-enyl phosphate phosphohydrolase. This enzyme catalyses the following chemical reaction

 2-hydroxy-5-(methylthio)-3-oxopent-1-enyl phosphate + H2O    1,2-dihydroxy-5-(methylthio)pent-1-en-3-one + phosphate

The enzyme participates in the methionine salvage pathway in Bacillus subtilis.

References

External links 
 

EC 3.1.3